Katra is a village in , Varėna district municipality, Alytus County, southeastern Lithuania. According to the 2001 census, the village had a population of 35 people. At the 2011 census, the population was 19.

Katra village is located c.  from Varėna,  from Marcinkonys,  from Paramėlis (the nearest settlement),  from the Belarusian border.

References

Villages in Varėna District Municipality